The 1940 National Football League All-star Game was the professional football league's second all-star game. The game pitted the Green Bay Packers, the league's champion for the 1939 season, against a team of all-stars. The game was played on Sunday, January 14, 1940, at Gilmore Stadium in Los Angeles, California in front of 18,000 fans. The Packers defeated the all-stars by a score of 16–7. The game was originally scheduled to be played on the previous Sunday, but it was delayed due to rain.

The players on the all-star squad were selected by a national poll of fans. Wilbur Crowell was the referee for the game.

Rosters
The players involved in this game were:

NFL All-Stars Roster

Green Bay Packers roster

Roster Notes:
Injured player; selected but did not play

References

Pro Bowl
All-Star Game (January)
National Football League All-Star Game (January)
National Football League All-Star Game (January)
1940 in Los Angeles
History of the Green Bay Packers
National Football League in Los Angeles
January 1940 sports events